This is a list of Italian football transfers, for the 2008–09 season, from and to Serie A and Serie B.

In July 2008 FIGC announced each Serie A clubs could signed up to 2 non-EU player to replace their old non-EU player who moved abroad, released or retired. These transfer were marked.

Summer transfer window

Summer transfer window (August)

See also
List of Italian football transfers Summer 2008 (co-ownership)

References
General
 
Specific

External links

Italy
Trans
2008